Yo y tú ("Me and You") was a long-running Colombian situation comedy, created by Spanish-born actress Alicia del Carpio. During its 20-year run on Sunday evenings, around 175 of the most famous Colombian actors appeared on it.

There was a brief "second season" in 1985, which would be cancelled February 1986.

After its end, del Carpio donated the scripts to Inravisión, the state broadcaster.

References

External links
 Alicia del Carpio at Colarte (includes magazine articles about Yo y tú)

1950s Colombian television series
1960s Colombian television series
1970s Colombian television series
1956 Colombian television series debuts
1976 Colombian television series endings
Colombian television sitcoms